Sergey Smagin (born in Norilsk, 8 September 1958) is a Russian chess grandmaster. 

He played in the Soviet championships of 1985 and 1986, obtaining his best result at Riga 1986, where he place 3rd-6th in a field of twenty. 

His tournament successes include the following:

 1984 : first at Tashkent
 1985 : equal first at Dresden
 1986 : first at the 2nd Cappelle-la-Grande Open
 1987 : equal first at the Chigorin Memorial of St Petersburg with Evgeny Pigusov and Andrei Kharitonov;  first at Trnava; equal first at Zenica; equal first at Sochi
 1988 : first at Berlin
 1993 : first at the Amantea open (repeated in 1994)
 2000 : equal first at Montreal with Eduardas Rozentalis

Smagin reached his peak Elo rating in April 2001, with 2613 points. 

He currently plays in the Russian team championship with the Club MCF Moskva.

External links
 

1958 births
Living people
People from Norilsk
Russian chess players
Soviet chess players
Chess grandmasters